The 1991–92 season was the 95th season of competitive football in Scotland.

Scottish Premier Division

Champions: Rangers
Relegated: St Mirren, Dunfermline Athletic

Scottish League Division One

Promoted: Dundee, Partick Thistle
Relegated: Montrose, Forfar Athletic

Scottish League Division Two

Promoted: Dumbarton, Cowdenbeath

Other honours

Cup honours

Individual honours

SPFA awards

SFWA awards

Scottish clubs in Europe

Average coefficient – 2.250

Scotland national team

Key:
(H) = Home match
(A) = Away match
ECQG2 = European Championship qualifying – Group 2
ECGB = European Championship – Group B

See also
1991–92 Aberdeen F.C. season
1991–92 Dundee United F.C. season
1991–92 Rangers F.C. season

Notes and references

 
Seasons in Scottish football